Richard Bannatyne (died 1605) was a Scottish clergyman and scribe who served as secretary to John Knox. His place in history is substantiated in his role as the compiler of the historical record, Memorials of Transactions in Scotland from 1569 to 1573.

References

Further reading

16th-century births
1605 deaths
Year of birth unknown
Place of birth unknown
Date of death unknown
Place of death unknown
16th-century Scottish writers
16th-century male writers
17th-century Scottish writers
17th-century Scottish clergy
17th-century male writers